Cercospora carotae is a fungal plant pathogen.

References

carotae
Fungal plant pathogens and diseases